Johannes Friedrich Miescher (13 August 1844 – 26 August 1895) was a Swiss physician and biologist. He was the first scientist to isolate nucleic acid in 1869. He also identified protamine and made a number of other discoveries.

Miescher had isolated various phosphate-rich chemicals, which he called nuclein (now nucleic acids), from the nuclei of white blood cells in Felix Hoppe-Seyler's laboratory at the University of Tübingen, Germany, paving the way for the identification of DNA as the carrier of inheritance. The significance of the discovery, first published in 1871, was not at first apparent, and Albrecht Kossel  made the initial inquiries into its chemical structure. Later, Miescher raised the idea that the nucleic acids could be involved in heredity and even posited that there might be something akin to an alphabet that might explain how variation is produced.

Early life and education
Friedrich Miescher came from a scientific family; his father and his uncle held the chair of anatomy at the University of Basel. As a boy, he was shy but intelligent. He had an interest in music as his father performed publicly. Miescher studied medicine at Basel. In the summer of 1865, he worked for the organic chemist Adolf Stecker at the University of Göttingen, but his studies were interrupted for the year when he became ill with typhoid fever, which left him hearing-impaired. He received his MD in 1868.

Career
Miescher felt that his partial deafness would be a disadvantage as a doctor, so he turned to physiological chemistry. He originally wanted to study lymphocytes, but was encouraged by Felix Hoppe-Seyler to study neutrophils. He was interested in studying the chemistry of the nucleus. Lymphocytes were difficult to obtain in sufficient numbers to study, while neutrophils were known to be one of the main and first components in pus and could be obtained from bandages at the nearby hospital. The problem was, however, washing the cells off the bandages without damaging them.

Miescher devised different salt solutions, eventually producing one with sodium sulfate. The cells were filtered. Since centrifuges were not available at the time, the cells were allowed to settle to the bottom of a beaker. He then tried to isolate the nuclei free of cytoplasm. He subjected the purified nuclei to an alkaline extraction followed by acidification, resulting in the formation of a precipitate that Miescher called nuclein (now known as DNA). He found that this contained phosphorus and nitrogen, but not sulfur. The discovery was so unlike anything else at the time that Hoppe-Seyler repeated all of Miescher's research himself before publishing it in his journal. Miescher then went on to study physiology at Leipzig in the laboratory of Carl Ludwig for a year before being appointed professor of physiology.

While analyzing the composition of salmon sperm, Miescher also discovered the alkaline substance protamine, which he published in 1874. It later found use, as protamine sulfate, in the stabilization of insulin (NPH insulin) and also as a reversal agent for the anticoagulant medicine heparin.

Miescher and his students researched much nucleic acid chemistry, but its function remained unknown. However, his discovery played an important part in the identification of nucleic acids as the carriers of inheritance. The importance of Miescher's discovery was not apparent until Albrecht Kossel (a German physiologist specializing in the physiological chemistry of the cell and its nucleus and of proteins) carried out research on the chemical structure of nuclein.

Friedrich Miescher is also known for demonstrating that carbon dioxide concentrations in blood regulate breathing.

Personal life
Miescher was married to Maria Anna Rüsch. He died of tuberculosis in 1895 aged 51.

Legacy
As of 2008, two laboratories have been named after Miescher:
The Friedrich Miescher Laboratory of the Max Planck Society in Tübingen and the Friedrich Miescher Institute for Biomedical Research in Basel, founded in 1970 by Ciba-Geigy .

See also 
 Friedrich Miescher Institute for Biomedical Research
 Friedrich Miescher Laboratory of the Max Planck Society

Notes and references

Bibliography
 
 
 
 
 
 
 
 
 
 
 
 
 
 Meyer Friedman and Gerald W. Friedland, Medicine's 10 Greatest Discoveries, pp. 194–196.
 Veigl, Harman, Lamm, "Friedrich Miescher's Discovery in the Historiography of Genetics", Journal of the History of Biology 53:3, 2020

External links
 Short biography and bibliography in the Virtual Laboratory of the Max Planck Institute for the History of Science
 FMI – Friedrich Miescher Institute
 The Friedrich Miescher Laboratory of the Max Planck Society
 Lasker Foundation
 FMI – DNA Pioneers and Their Legacy by Ulf Lagerkvist
 
 Wolf, George (2003). Friedrich Miescher, the man who discovered DNA. U.C.Berkeley.
 Ehud Lamm, Oren Harman, Sophie Juliane Veigl (2020).  Before Watson and Crick in 1953 Came Friedrich Miescher in 1869.  Genetics, 2020 Jun;215(2):291-296. doi:10.1534/genetics.120.303195.

1844 births
1895 deaths
History of genetics
Physicians from Basel-Stadt
Swiss biologists
Swiss biochemists
Tuberculosis deaths in Switzerland
University of Göttingen alumni
Academic staff of the University of Tübingen
19th-century deaths from tuberculosis